Spinal muscular atrophy with lower extremity predominance 2A (SMALED2A) is a rare neuromuscular disorder characterised by muscle weakness predominantly in legs. The disorder is usually diagnosed shortly after birth; affected children have a delayed motor development, waddling gait, difficulties walking, sometimes develop spasticity. Sensation, swallowing and cognitive development are not affected. The disorder is slowly progressive throughout the lifetime.

The disease is caused by a mutation in the BICD2 gene and is passed on in an autosomal dominant manner.

There is no known cure for SMALED2A.

See also 
 Spinal muscular atrophies
 Spinal muscular atrophy with lower extremity predominance 1
 Spinal muscular atrophy with lower extremity predominance 2B

References 

Autosomal dominant disorders
Neurogenetic disorders
Neuromuscular disorders
Rare diseases
Systemic atrophies primarily affecting the central nervous system